is a Japanese life insurance company, which is headquartered in Tokyo and created in 2004 from the merger of Meiji Life and Yasuda Life.  The company is one of the oldest and largest insurers in Japan. The Meiji Yasuda Life Insurance Company is a member of the Mitsubishi and Fuyo groups and participates in the former's Friday Conference.

History

In 1881, entrepreneur Zenjiro Yasuda founded the Yasuda Mutual Life Insurance Company, making it part of the Yasuda zaibatsu.

On January 1, 2004, Meiji Mutual Life Insurance Company and Yasuda Mutual Life Insurance Company merged to create the Meiji Yasuda Life Insurance Company.

References

External links
Company website (in Japanese)
Company website (in English)

 
Insurance companies based in Tokyo
Mutual insurance companies
Meiji Yasuda Life Insurance Company
Japanese brands
Fuyo Group
Financial services companies established in 1881
1881 establishments in Japan
Japanese companies established in 2004